George Wensley Clarkson (born September 1956) is an English true crime writer, biographer, novelist, and television writer and producer.

Selected publications
 Hit ’Em Hard: Jack Spot, King of the Underworld
 Moody: The Life and Crimes of Britain's Most Notorious Hitman
 Killing Charlie
 One Behind the Ear
 Armed Robbery
 Hash
 The Curse of Brink's-Mat
 Car Trouble: A Childhood On Four Wheels
 Public Enemy No. 1
 The Railroad Killer
 The Mother's Day Murder
 Women Behind Bars
 The Good Doctor
 Gang Wars of London - How the Streets of the Capital Became a Battleground
 Vanessa: A Portrait of Evil
 Kenny Noye: Public Enemy No 1 (Blake's True Crime Library)
 Gang Wars on the Costa
 The Mother From Hell - She Murdered Her Daughters and Turned Her Sons into Murderers
 Costa del Crime
 Billy Hill: Godfather of London - The Unparalleled Saga of Britain's Most Powerful Post-War Crime Boss
 Gangs of Britain: The Gripping True Stories of the Faces Who Run Britain's Organised Crime
 The Boss
 Hitman
 Deadly Seduction
 Bindon
 Armed and Dangerous
 The Devil's Work
 Doctors of Death: Ten True Crime Stories of Doctors Who Kill
 Slave Girls: The Shocking World of Human Bondage
 Tom Cruise: Unauthorized. Hastings House, 1998.
 Cocaine Confidential (2014)
 Legal Highs (2015)
 Sexy Beasts (2016)
 Killing Goldfinger (2017)

References

External links 
http://www.wensleyclarkson.com/

1956 births
Living people
Writers from London
English crime writers
English biographers
English television writers
English non-fiction crime writers
English television producers